Gail Anderson Graham (born January 16, 1964) is a Canadian professional golfer who played on the LPGA Tour.

Graham won twice on the LPGA Tour in 1995 and 1997.

Graham won the LPGA Tour's William and Mousie Powell Award (later renamed the Founders Award) in 2002. She was inducted into the Manitoba Golf Hall of Fame in 2008, the British Columbia Golf Hall of Fame in 2015, and the Canadian Golf Hall of Fame in 2017.

Professional wins

LPGA Tour wins (2)

Futures Tour wins
1988 Manhattan Classic

Other wins
1988 Canadian PGA Women's Championship

Legends Tour win
2016 Wendy's Charity Classic

Team appearances
Professional
Handa Cup (representing World team): 2009, 2010, 2011, 2012 (tie), 2013 (winners)

References

External links

Canadian female golfers
Lamar Lady Cardinals golfers
LPGA Tour golfers
Golfing people from British Columbia
People from the Regional District of Bulkley-Nechako
1964 births
Living people